"25 Years" is a 1978 song by the UK rock group Hawkwind, originally released as a single in the UK (CB332) on 18 May 1979. It is a slightly different version to the one on the album Hawklords.

The 12" single version was originally released in grey vinyl. However, due to a mistake at the pressing plant a small number were pressed in black vinyl. These are much harder to find.

Hawkwind songs
1978 singles
Songs written by Dave Brock
1978 songs
Charisma Records singles